The 2021 Ladies Tour of Norway was the eighth edition of the Ladies Tour of Norway, a women's road cycling stage race in Norway. The event took place from 12 to 15 August 2021 and is part of the 2021 UCI Women's World Tour. This edition is expected to be the last stand-alone Ladies Tour of Norway, as the race is set to expand to a six-day tour of Scandinavia (the Battle of the North) in 2022 that will also visit Denmark and Sweden.

Teams 
All nine UCI Women's WorldTeams, eight UCI Women's Continental Teams, and the Norwegian national team made up the eighteen teams that participated in the race. Of the 104 riders who started the race, 95 finished.

UCI Women's WorldTeams

 
 
 
 
 
 
 
 
 

UCI Women's Continental Teams

 
 
 
 
 
 
 
 

National Teams

 Norway

Route 
The 2021 Ladies Tour of Norway took place in the county of Viken in Eastern Norway, with most of the race in the Østfold region.

Stages

Stage 1 
12 August 2021 — Halden to Sarpsborg,

Stage 2 
13 August 2021 — Askim to Mysen,

Stage 3 
14 August 2021 — Drammen to Norefjell,

Stage 4 
15 August 2021 — Drøbak to Halden,

Classification leadership table 

 On stage 2, Christine Majerus, who was second in the points classification, wore the green jersey, because first-placed Kristen Faulkner wore the gold jersey as the leader of the general classification.

Final classification standings

General classification

Points classification

Mountains classification

Young rider classification

Team classification

See also 
 2021 in women's road cycling

Notes

References

Sources

External links 

Ladies Tour of Norway
Ladies Tour of Norway
Ladies Tour of Norway
Ladies Tour of Norway